Allen's Opera House is a historic commercial building in Cozad, Nebraska. It was built by Charles Hart and Mr. Shanholt in 1906 for Charles E. Allen, a businessman and banker who co-owned the Cozad State Bank and the Allen General Store. Both businesses were located on the first floor. The building has been listed on the National Register of Historic Places since September 28, 1988.

References

National Register of Historic Places in Dawson County, Nebraska
Commercial buildings completed in 1906
1906 establishments in Nebraska